The following events occurred in May 1903:

May 1, 1903 (Friday)
A US-registered barge, Fedelia, begins to leak, and sinks near Hen and Chickens Light off Florida. 
Two towed canal boats collide off Sixth Street, Jersey City, New Jersey, United States; one sinks.

May 2, 1903 (Saturday)
Judge Himes wins the 29th Kentucky Derby.
Born: Bing Crosby, US singer and actor, in Tacoma, Washington, under the name Harry Lillis Crosby, Jr. (died 1977); Benjamin Spock, US childcare expert, in New Haven, Connecticut (died 1998)

May 3, 1903 (Sunday)
The power system for the Mersey Railway, operating between Birkenhead and Liverpool by tunnel under the River Mersey, UK, is converted from steam to electricity.

May 4, 1903 (Monday)
Born: Princess Anna of Saxony, youngest child of Frederick Augustus III of Saxony and his wife Archduchess Luise, in Lindau, Bavaria (d. 1976)
Died: Gotse Delchev, 31, Macedonian Bulgarian revolutionary leader, killed in a skirmish with the Turkish army.

May 5, 1903 (Tuesday)

May 6, 1903 (Wednesday)

May 7, 1903 (Thursday)

May 8, 1903 (Friday)
Born: Fernandel, French actor, in Marseilles, as Fernand Joseph Désiré Contandin (died 1971)
Died: Paul Gauguin, 54, French Post-Impressionist artist (probable heart attack)

May 9, 1903 (Saturday)

May 10, 1903 (Sunday)
The first article identifying what will later be known as Crohn's disease, by Polish surgeon Antoni Leśniowski, is published in the weekly medical newspaper Medycyna.

May 11, 1903 (Monday)

May 12, 1903 (Tuesday)

May 13, 1903 (Wednesday)
In the United States, the Fremont, Elkhorn and Missouri Valley Railroad (later part of Chicago and North Western Railway) begins a passenger service to Casper, Wyoming.
An earthquake of magnitude 7.0 strikes the Pacific archipelago of Vanuatu, then known as the New Hebrides. 
Died: Apolinario Mabini, 38, Filipino politician and the country's first prime minister (cholera)

May 14, 1903 (Thursday)

May 15, 1903 (Friday)

May 16, 1903 (Saturday)
The first Coney Island Luna Park opens in Brooklyn, New York City.

May 17, 1903 (Sunday)

May 18, 1903 (Monday)
Opening of the deep water port at Burgas, Bulgaria.

May 19, 1903 (Tuesday)

May 20, 1903 (Wednesday)

May 21, 1903 (Thursday)

May 22, 1903 (Friday)
A Cuban–American Treaty of Relations is signed.
Died: Misao Fujimura, 16, Japanese philosophy student, remembered chiefly for his farewell poem (suicide)

May 23, 1903 (Saturday)

May 24, 1903 (Sunday)
The Paris–Madrid race for automobiles starts from the gardens of Versailles. The race became notable for the number of accidents, including at least eight rumoured fatalities. It is cancelled when the competitors reach Bordeaux.

May 25, 1903 (Monday)
Opening of the Lackawanna and Wyoming Valley Railroad in the United States; it is the first railroad in the country to use an electrified third rail.

May 26, 1903 (Tuesday)
Australian passenger-cargo ship SS Oakland founders in stormy weather in the Tasman Sea near Cabbage Tree Island off New South Wales; 11 people lose their lives and the remaining seven are picked up by the steamer SS Bellinger.
On departure from Antwerp, carrying emigrants to Canada, British passenger-cargo ship Huddersfield collides with Norwegian steamer SS Uto in the River Scheldt. All 22 passengers are drowned, but the 17 crew survive.
Românul de la Pind, the longest-running newspaper by and about Aromanians until World War II, is founded.
Died: Marcel Renault, 31, French racing driver and industrialist, of injuries incurred by crashing into a tree while competing in the Paris-Madrid race.

May 27, 1903 (Wednesday)

May 28, 1903 (Thursday)

May 29, 1903 (Friday)
Born: Bob Hope, US comedian and actor, in Eltham, Kent, UK, under the name Leslie Townes Hope (died 2003)

May 30, 1903 (Saturday)

May 31, 1903 (Sunday)

References

1903
1903–05
1903–04